Sus is the genus of wild and domestic pigs, within the even-toed ungulate family Suidae. Sus include domestic pigs (Sus domesticus) and their ancestor, the common Eurasian wild boar (Sus scrofa), along with other species. Sus species, like all suids, are native to the Eurasian and African continents, ranging from Europe to the Pacific islands. Suids other than the pig are the babirusa of Indonesia, the pygmy hog of South Asia, the warthogs of Africa, and other pig genera from Africa. The suids are a sister clade to peccaries.

Juvenile pigs are known as piglets. Pigs are highly social and intelligent animals.

With around 1 billion of this species alive at any time, the domestic pig is among the most populous large mammals in the world. Pigs are omnivores and can consume a wide range of food. Pigs are biologically similar to humans and are thus frequently used for human medical research.

Etymology
The Online Etymology Dictionary provides anecdotal evidence as well as linguistic, saying that the term derives

probably from Old English *picg, found in compounds, ultimate origin unknown. Originally "young pig" (the word for adults was swine). Apparently related to Low German bigge, Dutch big ("but the phonology is difficult" -- OED). ... Another Old English word for "pig" was fearh, related to furh "furrow," from PIE *perk- "dig, furrow" (source also of Latin porc-us "pig," see pork). "This reflects a widespread IE tendency to name animals from typical attributes or activities" [Roger Lass]. Synonyms grunter, oinker are from sailors' and fishermen's euphemistic avoidance of uttering the word pig at sea, a superstition perhaps based on the fate of the Gadarene swine, who drowned.

The Online Etymology Dictionary also traces the evolution of sow, the term for a female pig, through various historical languages:

Old English sugu, su "female of the swine," from Proto-Germanic *su- (cognates: Old Saxon, Old High German su, German Sau, Dutch zeug, Old Norse syr), from PIE root *su- (cognates: Sanskrit sukarah "wild boar, swine;" Avestan hu "wild boar;" Greek hys "swine;" Latin sus "swine", suinus "pertaining to swine"; Old Church Slavonic svinija "swine;" Lettish sivens "young pig;" Welsh hucc, Irish suig "swine; Old Irish socc "snout, plowshare"), possibly imitative of pig noise; note that Sanskrit sukharah means "maker of (the sound) su".

An adjectival form is porcine. Another adjectival form (technically for the subfamily rather than genus name) is suine (comparable to bovine, canine, etc.); for the family, it is suid (as with bovid, canid).

Description and behaviour

A typical pig has a large head with a long snout that is strengthened by a special prenasal bone and by a disk of cartilage at the tip. The snout is used to dig into the soil to find food and is a very acute sense organ.  Each foot has four hoofed toes, with the two larger central toes bearing most of the weight, and the outer two also being used in soft ground.

The rear teeth are adapted for crushing. In the male, the canine teeth form tusks, which grow continuously and are sharpened by constantly being ground against each other.

Occasionally, captive mother pigs may savage their own piglets, often if they become severely stressed. Some attacks on newborn piglets are non-fatal. Others may kill the piglets and sometimes, the mother may eat them. An estimated 50% of piglet fatalities are due to the mother attacking, or unintentionally crushing, the newborn pre-weaned animals.

Distribution and evolution
With around 1 billion individuals alive at any time, the domestic pig is one of the most numerous large mammals on the planet.

The ancestor of the domestic pig is the wild boar, which is one of the most numerous and widespread large mammals. Its many subspecies are native to all but the harshest climates of continental Eurasia and its islands and Africa as well, from Ireland and India to Japan and north to Siberia.

Long isolated from other pigs on the many islands of Indonesia, Malaysia, and the Philippines, pigs have evolved into many different species, including wild boar, bearded pigs, and warty pigs. Humans have introduced pigs into Australia, North and South America, and numerous islands, either accidentally as escaped domestic pigs which have gone feral, or as wild boar.

Habitat and reproduction
The wild boar (Sus scrofa) can take advantage of any forage resources. Therefore, they can live in virtually any productive habitat that can provide enough water to sustain large mammals such as pigs. If there is increased foraging of wild boars in certain areas, they can cause a nutritional shortage which can cause the pig population to decrease. If the nutritional state returns to normal, the pig population will most likely rise due to the pigs' naturally increased reproduction rate.

Diet and foraging
Pigs are omnivores, which means that they consume both plants and animals. In the wild, they are foraging animals, primarily eating leaves, roots, fruits, and flowers, in addition to some insects and fish. As livestock, pigs are fed mostly corn and soybean meal with a mixture of vitamins and minerals added. Traditionally, they were raised on dairy farms and called "mortgage lifters", due to their ability to use the excess milk and whey from cheese and butter making combined with pasture. Older pigs will consume three to five gallons of water per day. When kept as pets, the optimal healthy diet consists mainly of a balanced diet of raw vegetables, although some may give their pigs conventional mini pig pellet feed.

Relationship with humans

Most pigs today are domesticated pigs raised for meat (known as pork). Miniature breeds are commonly kept as pets. Because of their foraging abilities and excellent sense of smell, people in many European countries use them to find truffles. Both wild and feral pigs are commonly hunted.

Apart from meat, pig skin is turned into leather, and their hairs are used to make brushes. The relatively short, stiff, coarse pig hairs are called bristles, and were once so commonly used in paintbrushes that in 1946 the Australian Government launched Operation Pig Bristle. In May 1946, in response to a shortage of pig bristles for paintbrushes to paint houses in the post-World War II construction boom, the Royal Australian Air Force (RAAF) flew in 28 short tons of pig bristles from China, their only commercially available source at the time.

Use in human healthcare

Human skin is very similar to pig skin, therefore many preclinical studies employ pig skin. In addition to providing use in biomedical research and for drug testing, genetic advances in human healthcare have provided a pathway for domestic pigs to become xenotransplantation candidates
for humans.

Species

The genus Sus is currently thought to contain nine living species. Several extinct species (†) are known from fossils.

Extant species 
Sus ahoenobarbus  Huet, 1888 – Palawan bearded pig
Sus barbatus Müller, 1838 - Bornean bearded pig
Sus cebifrons Heude, 1888 – Visayan warty pig
Sus celebensis Müller & Schlegel, 1843 – Celebes warty pig or Sulawesi warty pig
Sus domesticus Erxleben, 1777 – Domestic pig (sometimes considered subspecies of S. scrofa)
Sus oliveri Groves, 1997 – Oliver's warty pig or Mindoro warty pig
Sus philippensis Nehring, 1886 – Philippine warty pig
Sus scrofa Linnaeus, 1758 – Wild boar 
Sus verrucosus Boie, 1832 – Javan warty pig
The pygmy hog, formerly Sus salvanius, is now placed in the monotypic genus Porcula.

Fossil species 

 †Sus australis Han, 1987 – Early Pleistocene of China
 †Sus bijiashanensis Han et al., 1975 – Early Pleistocene of China
 †Sus falconeri – Pleistocene of the Siwalik region, India
†Sus houi Qi et al., 1999 – Pleistocene of China
†Sus hysudricus Falconer and Cautley 1847 – Pliocene of India
†Sus jiaoshanensis Zhao, 1980 – Early Pleistocene of China
†Sus liuchengensis Han, 1987 – Early Pleistocene of China
†Sus lydekkeri Zdansky, 1928 – Pleistocene of China
†Sus officinalis Koenigswald, 1933 – Middle Pleistocene of China
†Sus peii Han, 1987 – Early Pleistocene of China
†Sus subtriquetra Xue, 1981
†Sus strozzi Forsyth Major, 1881 - Pliocene and Early Pleistocene of Europe
†Sus xiaozhu Han et al., 1975 – Early Pleistocene of China

Domestication

Pigs have been domesticated since ancient times in the Old World. Pigs were domesticated on each end of Eurasia, and possibly several times. It is now thought that pigs were attracted to human settlements for the food scraps, and that the process of domestication began as a commensal relationship. Archaeological evidence suggests that pigs were being managed in the wild in a way similar to the way they are managed by some modern New Guineans from wild boar as early as 13,000–12,700 BP in the Near East in the Tigris Basin, Çayönü, Cafer Höyük, Nevalı Çori. Remains of pigs have been dated to earlier than 11,400 BP in Cyprus that must have been introduced from the mainland which suggests domestication in the adjacent mainland by then. 

Pigs were also domesticated in China, potentially more than once. In some parts of China pigs were kept in pens from early times, separating them from wild populations and allowing farmers to create breeds that were fatter and bred more quickly. Early Modern Europeans brought these breeds back home and crossed them with their own pigs, which was the origins of most modern pig breeds.

In India, pigs have been domesticated for a long time mostly in Goa and some rural areas for pig toilets. This practice also occurred in China. Though ecologically logical as well as economical, pig toilets are waning in popularity as use of septic tanks and/or sewerage systems is increasing in rural areas.

Hernando de Soto and other early Spanish explorers brought pigs to southeastern North America from Europe. As in Medieval Europe, pigs are valued on certain oceanic islands for their self-sufficiency, which allows them to be turned loose, although the practice does have drawbacks (see environmental impact).

The domestic pig (Sus domesticus) is usually given the scientific name Sus scrofa domesticus, although some taxonomists, including the American Society of Mammalogists, call it S. domesticus, reserving S. scrofa for the wild boar. It was domesticated approximately 5,000 to 7,000 years ago. The upper canines form sharp distinctive tusks that curve outward and upward. Compared to other artiodactyles, their head is relatively long, pointed, and free of warts.

In November 2012, scientists managed to sequence the genome of the domestic pig. The similarities between the pig and human genomes mean that the new data may have wide applications in the study and treatment of human genetic diseases.

In August 2015, a study looked at over 100 pig genome sequences to ascertain their process of domestication. The process of domestication was assumed to have been initiated by humans, involved few individuals and relied on reproductive isolation between wild and domestic forms. The study found that the assumption of reproductive isolation with population bottlenecks was not supported. The study  indicated that pigs were domesticated separately in Western Asia and China, with Western Asian pigs introduced into Europe where they crossed with wild boar. A model that fitted the data included admixture with a now extinct ghost population of wild pigs during the Pleistocene. The study also found that despite back-crossing with wild pigs, the genomes of domestic pigs have strong signatures of selection at DNA loci that affect behavior and morphology. The study concluded that human selection for domestic traits likely counteracted the homogenizing effect of gene flow from wild boars and created domestication islands in the genome. The same process may also apply to other domesticated animals.

In culture

Pigs have been important in culture across the world since neolithic times. They appear in art, literature, and religion. In Asia the wild boar is one of 12 animal images comprising the Chinese zodiac, while in Europe the boar represents a standard charge in heraldry. In Islam and Judaism pigs and those who handle them are viewed negatively, and the consumption of pork is forbidden. Pigs are alluded to in animal epithets and proverbs. 
The pig has been celebrated throughout Europe since ancient times in its carnivals, the name coming from the Italian carne levare, the lifting of meat.

Pigs have been brought into literature for varying reasons, ranging from the pleasures of eating, as in Charles Lamb's A Dissertation upon Roast Pig, to William Golding's Lord of the Flies (with the fat character "Piggy"), where the rotting boar's head on a stick represents Beelzebub, "lord of the flies" being the direct translation of the Hebrew בעל זבוב, and George Orwell's allegorical novel Animal Farm, where the central characters, representing Soviet leaders, are all pigs.

Environmental damage

Domestic pigs that have escaped from urban areas or were allowed to forage in the wild, and in some cases wild boars which were introduced as prey for hunting, have given rise to large populations of feral pigs in North and South America, Australia, New Zealand, Hawaii, and other areas where pigs are not native. Accidental or deliberate releases of pigs into countries or environments where they are an alien species have caused extensive environmental change. Their omnivorous diet, aggressive behaviour, and their feeding method of rooting in the ground all combine to severely alter ecosystems unused to pigs. Pigs will even eat small animals and destroy nests of ground nesting birds. The Invasive Species Specialist Group lists feral pigs on the list of the world's 100 worst invasive species and says:

Health problems

Because of their biological similarities, pigs can harbour a range of parasites and diseases that can be transmitted to humans. Examples of such zoonoses include trichinosis, Taenia solium, cysticercosis, and brucellosis. Pigs also host large concentrations of parasitic ascarid worms in their digestive tracts.

Some strains of influenza are endemic in pigs, the most significant of which are H1N1, H1N2, and H3N2, the first of which has caused several outbreaks among humans, including the Spanish flu, 1977 Russian flu pandemic, and the 2009 swine flu pandemic. Pigs also can acquire human influenza.

See also

Babirusa
Bushpig
Domestic pig  
Entelodont
Feral pig
Fetal pig
Hog-baiting
List of fictional pigs
List of pigs
Miniature pig
Peccary
Pig Beach
Pig Olympics
Red river hog
Truffle hog
Vietnamese Pot-bellied
Wild boar

References

External links
 Pig genome resources
 Swine breeds, with pictures

 
Coprophagous animals
Mammals described in 1758
Taxa named by Carl Linnaeus
Mammal genera
Suinae